Nicolás Alberto Zedán Abu-Ghosh (born 7 June 2000) is a professional footballer who plays as a forward for West Bank Premier League club Shabab Al-Khalil. Born in Chile, he initially represented Chile at under-20 level before representing the Palestine national team.

Club career
Zedán is a product of Palestino. He made his professional debut on 12 May 2018, against Huachipato in the Chilean Primera División. Zedán was in the starting lineup but was replaced after 53 minutes. This game was his first and last game in that season. In the following season, he played only 15 minutes in total for the first team of Palestino.

In 2020, Zedán moved to San Luis de Quillota on loan. On 11 February 2022, Zedán joined Chilean Segunda División club Deportes Recoleta.

In November 2022, Zedán moved to the Palestinian West Bank Premier League to join Shabab Al-Khalil.

International career
In June 2018, Zedán was called up for the Chilean U20 national team.

In February 2019, he was called up for the Palestine national team squad to play the 2019 AFC Asian Cup. In 2022, he was called up for the 2023 AFC Asian Cup qualifiers in June 2022.

References

External links
 
 Nicolás Zedán at San Luis' website

2000 births
Living people
Footballers from Santiago
Chilean people of Palestinian descent
Citizens of the State of Palestine through descent
Chilean footballers
Palestinian footballers
Association football forwards
Club Deportivo Palestino footballers
San Luis de Quillota footballers
Deportes Recoleta footballers
Shabab Al-Khalil SC players
Chilean Primera División players
Primera B de Chile players
Chile under-20 international footballers